Buraimi Airport is an airport serving the town of Al-Buraimi in Oman.

See also
Transport in Oman
List of airports in Oman

References

External links
 OurAirports - Oman
 OpenStreetMap - Buraimi
 Buraimi
 

Airports in Oman